The Lady Doctor (also known as Totò, Vittorio and the Doctor) is a 1957 Italian comedy film directed by Camillo Mastrocinque.

Plot 
Michele and Gennaro work as attendants in the investigation agency "Nulla sfugge" ("Nothing escapes"). When their boss is forced to be absent from the office to follow an important investigation, the two decide to take his place, pretending to be skilled investigators. Two old sisters, Ada and Ida, come to the agency to ask them to investigate the conduct of the wife of their only nephew, an American doctor from Boston, and they accept the case, which will turn out to be a mess.

Cast 

Totò as  Michele Spillone aka Mike
Vittorio De Sica as  Marquis Vittorio de Vitti
Abbe Lane as  Dr. Brigitte Baker
Titina De Filippo as  Marquise de Vitti
Germán Cobos as  Lawyer Otello Bellomo 
Pierre Mondy as  Romeo
Agostino Salvietti as  Gennaro
Tecla Scarano as  Ada Barbalunga
Darry Cowl as  Egisto 
Rafael Bardem as Elia Vagoni 
Luigi Pavese as  Head of the investigative agency
Franco Coop as   La Conchiglia'''s Maitre
Giulio Calì as  Fool from Villa Valeria 
Dante Maggio as  La Conchiglia'''s Waiter
Teddy Reno as  Himself
Antonio Acqua as  Count Salvi

References

External links

1957 films
1957 comedy films
Films directed by Camillo Mastrocinque
Italian comedy films
1950s Italian films